Rannamõisa Landscape Conservation Area is a nature park which is located in Harju County, Estonia.

The area of the nature park is 67 ha.

The protected area was founded in 1959 to protect Rannamõisa Cliff.

References

Nature reserves in Estonia
Geography of Harju County